Milan Truban (14 March 1904 – 7 August 1929) was a Yugoslav cyclist. He competed in two events at the 1924 Summer Olympics.

References

External links
 

1904 births
1929 deaths
Yugoslav male cyclists
Olympic cyclists of Yugoslavia
Cyclists at the 1924 Summer Olympics
Place of birth missing